Paromita Banerjee, is a leading Indian fashion designer and a member of the Fashion Design Council of India

Education

She studied at the National Institute of Design (NID), Ahmedabad, India and thereafter received a scholarship from Konstfack University of Art and Culture in Stockholm.

Work

Her work is primarily influenced by the concept of “hand-made” handloom fabrics. Her major assignment was for “Handmade in India” in Himachal Pradesh - a project collaboration of DCH and NID.

Passion

Other than her work, her true passion in life is photography. It was her passion for photography that marked her foray into the fashion designing field.

References

National Institute of Design alumni
Living people
Indian fashion designers
Year of birth missing (living people)